The following is a list of international trips made by Kim Jong-il during his tenure as General Secretary of the Central Committee of the Workers' Party of Korea and Chairman of the National Defence Commission, capacities which he served in from 1994 to 2011.

The number of visits per country where he traveled are:
 
 Three visits to the Russian Federation
 Seven visits to China

Summary of official trips

See also
 Kim Jong-il
 List of international trips made by Kim Jong-un
 List of international trips made by Kim Il-sung
 North Korean leaders' trains
 
 Awards and decorations received by Kim Jong-il

References

State visits by North Korean leaders
Kim Jong-il
Diplomacy-related lists